Kashyap is an Indian surname base on the Kashyap caste. Notable people with the surname include:

Aakarshi Kashyap
Abhinav Kashyap
Ajay Kashyap
Anil Kashyap
Anjana Om Kashyap
Anurag Kashyap
Anurag Kashyap (contestant)
Baliram Kashyap
Bimla Kashyap Sood
Bharti Kashyap
Dinesh Kashyap
Dharmendra Kashyap
D.D. Kashyap

Parupalli Kashyap
Rangasami L. Kashyap
Subhash C. Kashyap
Tulsiram Sharma Kashyap
Kumar Kashyap Mahasthavir
Vasundhara Kashyap
Geeta Kashyap Vemuganti
Santosh Kashyap
Sunil Kashyap
Shibani Kashyap
Vijay Kashyap
Suresh Kumar Kashyap
Ramadhar Kashyap
Virender Kashyap
Vijay Kumar Kashyap
Ram Kumar Kashyap
Narendra Kumar Kashyap
Shiv Ram Kashyap
Rameshwar Singh Kashyap
Jagdish Kashyap
Shaiza Kashyap
Suraj Kashyap
Praveen Kashyap
Reena Kashyap
Sagar Kashyap
Kedar Nath Kashyap
Rajpal Kashyap
Roop Dass Kashyap
Rishabh Kashyap
Suresh Kashyap

See also

Kashyapa

Indian surnames